Crinophtheiros is a genus of sea snails, marine gastropod mollusks in the family Eulimidae.

Species
The species within this genus include the following:

 Crinophtheiros collinsi (Sykes, 1903)
 Crinophtheiros comatulicola (Graff, 1875)
 Crinophtheiros giustii (Gaglini, 1991)
 Crinophtheiros junii (de Folin, 1887)

References

External links
 To World Register of Marine Species

Eulimidae